Carex jacens is a tussock-forming species of perennial sedge in the family Cyperaceae. It is native to Japan and the Kuril Islands.

See also
List of Carex species

References

jacens
Plants described in 1908
Taxa named by Charles Baron Clarke
Flora of Japan
Flora of the Kuril Islands